Coleophora lebedella is a moth of the family Coleophoridae. It is found in Spain, southern Russia, central Asia and Iran. It occurs in desert-steppe and desert biotopes.

Adults are on wing from the end of May to June.

The larvae feed on Atriplex tatarica, Atriplex glauca, Atriplex nitens and possibly Chenopodium species. They feed on the leaves of their host plant.

References

lebedella
Moths described in 1982
Moths of Europe
Moths of Asia